XHWS-FM is a radio station on 102.5 FM in Culiacán, Sinaloa. It is owned by Grupo RSN and carries the La Bestia Grupera grupera format.

History
XEWS-AM received its concession on November 15, 1957. It was owned by Modesto Roberto Pérez and broadcast on 1010 kHz with 5,000 watts day and 250 night. Humaya, S.A. acquired XEWS in the 1960s. By 2000, Grupo ACIR owned XEWS, but ACIR sold it and other stations to Radiorama.

In December 2016, XHWS and sister station XHENZ-FM 92.9 were separated from Radiorama and flipped to MegaRadio formats, marking MegaRadio's second expansion in Sinaloa in just months after it had previously entered Mazatlán. As a result, XHWS changed from Los 40 to Switch FM, keeping a pop format, but this lasted just eight months until the Audiorama La Bestia Grupera format was instituted.

In 2017, XHWS was sold by Radiorama to Grupo RSN, making it sister to XHESA-FM 101.7. However, XHWS continues to carry the La Bestia Grupera format and is also the Culiacán affiliate for the national afternoon newscast hosted by Javier Alatorre, which is syndicated by Grupo Comunicación Integral de México, a company affiliated with Audiorama.

References

Radio stations in Sinaloa